Apache 1 is an experimental aircraft jointly made by Aerotech S.A. of Switzerland and Aviation Composite Technology Inc. for the production in the Philippines and worldwide sale of the Apache I aircraft. The Apache I is a two-seater single-engine trainer aircraft based on the Lancair 320 homebuilt aircraft.

The plane was planned to be used by the Armed Forces of the Philippines and the Philippine National Police.

External links
Timawa Forum Discussion

References 

Aircraft manufactured in the Philippines
Science and technology in the Philippines